Lou Terreaux (born 14 April 2002) is a French ice dancer. With her skating partner, Noé Perron, she is the 2022 Bavarian Open and Bosphorus Cup bronze medalist. The two represented France at the 2020 World Junior Championships.

Career

Early years 
Terreaux began learning to skate in 2007. She teamed up with Noé Perron by 2016. Early in their career, the two were coached by Eric Le Mercier and were members of ASM Belfort.

Terreaux/Perron debuted on the ISU Junior Grand Prix (JGP) series in August-September 2018, placing eighth in Linz, Austria. They trained in Villard-de-Lans, coached by Karine Arribert-Narce, Violetta Zakhlyupana, and Vladimir Pastukhov.

Terreaux/Perron retained the same coaches for the 2019–20 season. They had two JGP assignments, placing sixth in France and eighth in Russia. Silver medalists at the French Junior Championships, they were named in France's team to the 2020 World Junior Championships in Tallinn. The two finished 15th overall in Estonia after placing 15th in both segments.

Senior career 
Terreaux/Perron made their senior international debut in October 2021, at the Trophée Métropole Nice Côte d'Azur. In January 2022, they won bronze at the Bavarian Open in Oberstdorf, Germany.

In December 2022, they were awarded bronze at the Bosphorus Cup in Istanbul, Turkey. They are coached by Olivier Schoenfelder, Marien de la Asuncion, and Muriel Zazoui in Lyon, France.

Programs

With Perron

Competitive highlights 
CS: Challenger Series; JGP: Junior Grand Prix

With Perron

References

External links 
 
 
 

2002 births
French female ice dancers
Living people
Sportspeople from Belfort
21st-century French women